The Hebrew incunabula are a group of Jewish religious texts printed in Hebrew in the 15th century.

Only about 100 incunabula are determined to have been definitively printed before 1500.  There are eight of which either no copy is known, or the time and place of publication can not be definitely determined. Currently, more than 100 incunabula have been discovered since an article was first written about the topic in the Jewish Encyclopedia in 1901.

The total number of identified Hebrew incunabula is about 175, though more may exist or have existed. A list of ascertained incunabula is given in tabular form on pp. 578 and 579 of the 1901 Jewish Encyclopedia article, and to these may be added the last-mentioned eight, which include the Talmud tractates Ketubot, Giṭṭin, and Baba Meẓi'a, each printed separately by Joshua Soncino in 1488-89, and of which no copy is known to exist. The same fate has met all the copies of the Leiria Edition of the Early Prophets (1494). There is also a siddur of the Roman rite, probably published by one of the Soncinos, and, from its type, likely to be of the fifteenth century. This was first described by Berliner ("Aus Meiner Bibliothek," p. 58); a copy is possessed by E. N. Adler of London, and an incomplete copy is in the library  of Frankfort-on-the-Main. In addition, there are two editions of Maimonides' Mishneh Torah, one possibly printed in Italy in the fifteenth century, a copy of which is in the library of the Vienna community; the other, parts of which Dr. E. Mittwoch of Berlin possesses, was probably printed in Spain.

Date of first printing
The date at which printing in Hebrew began can not be definitely established. There is a whole series of works without date or place (12-21) which experts are inclined to assign to Rome (where Latin printing began in 1467), and any or all of these may be before the first dated work, which is an edition of Rashi's commentary on the Pentateuch, published in Reggio, Calabria, by Abraham Garton, 5 February 1475. It may be assumed that the actual printing of this work took some time, and that it was begun in the latter part of 1474. Even this must have been preceded by the printing of the four parts of the Ṭurim of Jacob B. Asher, finished 3 July 1475, in Piove di Sacco by Meshullam Cusi, which must have taken considerably longer to print than the Rashi. It is exceptional for Hebrew works to be dated at all before 1482, but from that time onward to 1492, during which decade two-thirds of the Hebrew incunabula were produced, most of them are dated. With the expulsion from Spain in 1492 the Hebrew printing-presses in that country were stopped, and those in Italy and Portugal produced only about a dozen works during the remainder of the century.

Places of printing
Hebrew books were produced in the fifteenth century only in the Italian and Iberian peninsulas, though several of the printers were of German origin, as Abraham Jedidiah, the Soncinos, Ḥayyim ha-Levi, Joseph and Azriel Gunzenhauser. The period under review was perhaps the nadir of Jewish fortunes in Germany. Expulsions occurred throughout the land, and it is not to be wondered at that no Hebrew presses were started in the land of printing. In all there are known seventeen places where Hebrew printing took place in the fifteenth century—eleven in Italy, three in Spain, and three in Portugal, as may be seen from the following list, which gives in chronological order the places, the names of the printers, and numbers (in parentheses) indicating the works printed by each, the numbers having reference to the table on pp. 578, 579. Italy.

Table of incunabula

Printers 
As to the personal history of the printers enumerated in the list above very few details are known. Abraham Conat was a physician whose wife also was interested in printing; she produced the first edition of the "Beḥinat 'Olam." Garton, Cusi, and Giacon appear to have produced their works as a labor of love rather than for profit. Abraham dei Tintori, the Soncinos, and the Gunzenhausers, on the other hand, seem to have regarded their craft as a means of livelihood, The Soncinos, indeed, printed books in other characters than Hebrew (see Soncino family), as did also Abraham d'Ortas. There does not appear to have been much competition, though it is remarkable how invariably the choice of publishers fell within a limited class of works. In one case, however, two printers of the same city opposed each other with an edition of the same work. In August 1490, Joseph Gunzenhauser produced at Naples an edition of Ḳimḥi's "Shorashim"; on 11 February 1491, the same work was produced, as Zedner states, by Isaac b. Judah b. David Katorzi, who, according to Proctor, was also the printer of the Naples Naḥmanides of 1490. It would seem also that the two Pentateuchs of Hijar, 1490, were produced by rival printers.

Typographical details
All forms of Hebrew type were used in this period, the square, the Rashi or rabbinic (in which the first dated work was entirely printed), and the so-called "Weiberteutsch" (in which the later Yiddish works were printed); a primitive form of this last had already been used in the Psalms of 1477. Different sizes of type were used as early as the Ṭurim of Piove di Sacco, which uses no less than three. The actual fonts have not yet been determined, and until this is done no adequate scientific treatment of the subject is possible. A beginning, however, has been made by Proctor. Generally speaking, a more rounded form was used in Spain and Portugal (perhaps under the influence of Arabic script) than in the Italian presses, whose types were somewhat Gothic in style. It has been conjectured that the Spanish printers used logotypes in addition to the single letters. The Soncinos and Alantansis used initials, in other presses vacant spaces were left for them to be inserted by hand. Vowel-points were only used for Scripture or for prayer-books, and accents seem to have been inserted for the first time in the Bologna Pentateuch of 1482 (25). Special title-pages were rare; colophons were usually short. Borders were used by the Soncinos, as well as by Toledano at Lisbon and D'Ortas in the Ṭur of 1495 (see Borders; Colophon; Title-Page). Illustrations were only used in one book, the "Mashal ha-Ḳadmoni" (75). Printers' marks appear to have been used only in Spain and Portugal, each of the works produced in Hijar having a different mark. Of the number of copies printed for an edition the only detail known is that relating to the Psalms with Ḳimḥi in 1477, of which three hundred were printed. If this number applies to many of the incunabula, it is not surprising that they are extremely rare at the present day. Twenty of them exist only in a single copy; most of the rest are imperfect through misuse or have been disfigured by censors.

Location 
A majority of the examples still extant exist in seven public libraries (British Museum, London; Columbia University, New York; Bibliothèque Nationale, Paris; Bodleian, Oxford; Frankfort City Library; Biblioteca Palatina, Parma; Asiatic Museum, St. Petersburg) and seven or eight private collections (E. N. Adler, London; Dr. Chwolson, St. Petersburg; A. Freimann, Frankfort; Dr. M. Gaster, London; Baron Günzburg, St. Petersburg; H. B. Levy, Hamburg; Mayer Sulzberger, Philadelphia). The numbers included in each of these collections are given in the following lists, with the letters by which they are indicated in the table on pp. 578, 579. Each of the following lists has been checked and authenticated by the librarian or owner of the collection, and is here published for the first time. The remaining locations are mentioned in the table only in sporadic instances, and do not profess to exhaust the incunabula contained in such collections as those of Amsterdam, Berlin, Breslau, Carlsruhe, Munich, etc. Dr. N. Porges of Leipsic and Dr. Simonsen of Copenhagen are also understood to have collections.
see table

But few details are known as to the actual prices paid for some of these works. It would appear that Reuchlin paid three Rhine gulden for the Naples Naḥmanides of 1490 and the Former Prophets with Ḳimḥi (Soncino, 1485), and twice as much for the Soncino Bible of 1488. A note at the end of De Rossi's copy of the Guadalajara Ḳimḥi of 1482 states that three carline were paid for it in 1496 by the owner of that date.

Choice of books
The subject-matter of the works selected for the honors of print was on the whole what might have been anticipated. First came the Bible text, either a part (19, 30, 49, 68, 74, 77, 84, 91, 92, 93) or the whole (51, 76, 94). A large number of Bible commentaries was printed, including those of Abraham ibn Ezra (53), Baḥya ben Asher (87), David Ḳimḥi (6, 22, 37, 40, 46, 83), David ibn Yaḥya (82), Immanuel of Rome (39), Levi b. Gershon (4, 11, 16), Naḥmanides (14, 59, 72), and Rashi (1, 12, 25, 28, 44, 48): some of the works contained a combination of commentaries (43, 65, 79, 88). Then came the Mishnah (86) and parts of the Talmud (29, 30, 56, 57, 58, 60, 90). As further aids to these were grammars (54, 85), Ḳimḥi's Bible lexicon (21, 73, 78), and the Talmud lexicon of Nathan b. Jehiel (13). Next in popularity to Bible and Talmud came the halakic works, especially the codes of Jacob b. Asher (2, 3, 5, 27, 35, 45, 64, 67, 98)—the most popular single work—Maimonides (18, 71), and Moses de Coucy (15, 55), together with the "Agur" (89) and Kol Bo (69). To these may be added the solitary volume of responsa, that of Solomon ben Adret (17).

After law came prayers, of which a considerable number were printed (36, 41, 42, 47, 63, 95, 96, 97, 100); and to these may be added the tables of day durations (23)and Naḥmanides' "Sha'ar ha-Gemul" (70). Ethical works were moderately frequent (10, 31, 32, 53, 60, 61, 62, 66), which only two philosophical works received permanent form in print, Maimonides' "Moreh" (24), and Albo's "'Iḳḳarim" (38). Very few belletristic works appeared (75, 80); history is represented by Eldad ha-Dani (7) and the "Yosippon" (8); and science by Avicenna (81), in the most bulky Hebrew book printed in the fifteenth century.  It is characteristic that the only book known to be printed during its author's lifetime was the "Nofet Ẓufim" of Judah b. Jehiel (9), one of the few Hebrew works showing the influence of the Renaissance. It is doubtful whether Landau's "Agur" was issued during the author's life-time, though it may have been printed with the aid of his son Abraham, who was a compositor in Naples at the time. Very few works went into a second edition, Maḥzor Romi (36, 42, 95) and the tractate Beẓah (30, 90) being the chief exceptions. The reprinting of Beẓah seems to show that this treatise was the one selected then, as it is now, for initial instruction in the Talmud.

As regards the second class of incunabula of Jewish interest—such as were printed in other languages than Hebrew—these have never before been treated, and only a few specimens can be here referred to. They deal with topics of controversial interest, as the "Contra Perfidos Judeos" of Peter Schwarz (Eslingen, 1475), his "Stella Meschiah" (ib. 1477), and the well-known "Epistle" of Samuel of Morocco (Cologne, 1493). Two earlier tractates deal with the legend of Simon of Trent (Hain, Nos. 7,733, 15,658), while there exists in Munich an illustrated broadside relating to the blood accusation at Passau, printed as early as 1470. Folz's "Die Rechnung Kolpergers von dem Gesuch die Juden" (Nuremberg, 1491; Hain, No. 7,210) may also be referred to. Chief among the incunabula of this kind, however, are those of Latin translations of the medieval Jewish scientists and philosophers, as that of Abraham ibn Ezra, "De Nativitatibus" (1485, Venice), of Bonet de Latis, Astronomy (1493, Rome), of Maimonides, Aphorisms (Bologna; Hain, No. 10,524), and of Israeli, "De Particularibus Diæctis" (Padua, 1487). One of the most interesting of Latin incunabula is the version of Abraham Zacuto's tables published in Leiria by Abraham d'Ortas (1496).

References

Jewish Encyclopedia Bibliography
 De Rossi, Annales Hebræo-Typographici, section xv., Parma, 1795;
 Cassel and Steinschneider, Jüdische Typographie, in Ersch and Gruber, Encyc. section ii., part 28, pp. 33–37;
 M. Schwab, Les Incunables Orientaux, Paris, 1883;
 Chwolson, Reshit Ma'ase ha-Defut be-Yisrael, Warsaw, 1897;
 Berliner, Ueber den Einfluss, Frankfort-on-the-Main, 1897;
 Simonsen, Hebraisk Bogtryk, Copenhagen, 1901;
 Proctor, Index of Printed Books in the British Museum, 1901;
 Freimann, Ueber Hebräische Inkunabeln, in Central-blatt für Bibliothekswesen, 1902, vol. xix. (printed separately, Leipsic);
 Leone Luzzatto, in Vesillo, 1900, pp. 296 et seq.G. J.

External links
 
 Online chapter from Yardeni, Ada., The Book of Hebrew Script: History, Paleography, Script Styles, Calligraphy and Design,  New Castle, DE:Oak Knoll Press 2002

Incunabula
Jewish printing and publishing